The women's individual pursuit at the 2008 Summer Olympics took place on August 17 at the Laoshan Velodrome.

The first round of this track cycling event consisted of head-to-head races over a 3000 m distance, but with the results being treated as time trial results rather than elimination rounds. The top eight times from the first round qualified the cyclists for the elimination round, and either or both of the cyclists in each first round race could move on. In the match round, the eight cyclists were paired off according to the seeding from the first round. The winner of each match round match advanced to the final, while the four losers were given final rankings (5th through 8th) based on their times in the match round. The four finalists were placed into the gold medal match and bronze medal match based on their times in the match round.

Competition format 
The thirteen cyclists were matched into six two-rider heats and one heat of a single rider in the preliminary round. The eight riders with the fastest recorded times progressed to the match rounds.

In the match round, the top eight riders from the preliminaries were matched together, 1 vs. 8, 2 vs. 7, 3 vs. 6, and 4 vs. 5, for the semifinals. In the semifinals, the winner of each match advanced to race for a medal; the two fastest raced for gold and silver, while the two slower winners faced each other for the bronze.

Schedule 
All times are China standard time (UTC+8)

Results

Qualification

Match rounds

Semifinals
Qualification rule: Two fastest cyclists advance to the gold medal match (Q), while the next two to the bronze medal match (q).

Medal round
Bronze medal match 

Gold medal match

References

External links 
NBC Olympics

Track cycling at the 2008 Summer Olympics
Cycling at the Summer Olympics – Women's individual pursuit
Olymp
Women's events at the 2008 Summer Olympics